Hannele Klemettilä (Hannele Klemettilä-McHale; born 1966 in Helsinki, Finland) is a Finnish historian, medievalist, and author  living in Manhattan, New York, and the medieval village of Sonning-on-Thames in the county of Berkshire. She studied cultural history at the University of Turku, earned a Ph.D. in medieval history from the University of Leiden in the Netherlands, and was a Postdoctoral Researcher of the Academy of Finland in 2008–2010. She is an adjunct professor of cultural history at the University of Turku, and a Life Member at the Clare Hall, University of Cambridge. She published Epitomes of Evil (Brepols 2006), and other books on late medieval cultural history. Her research interests include late medieval penal culture, representations of the executioner, Gilles de Rais, cooking and cookery books, conceptions of cruelty, medieval symbolism, attitudes to animals and nature.

Selected bibliography
 The Executioner in Late Medieval French Culture. University of Turku 2003. .
 Keskiajan pyövelit (Medieval Executioners). Atena 2004. .
 Ritari Siniparta: Gilles de Rais’n tarina. (Story of Gilles de Rais) Atena 2005. .
 Epitomes of Evil: Representations of Executioners in Northern France and the Low Countries in the Late Middle Ages. Brepols 2006. .
 Keskiajan keittiö (Medieval Cuisine). Atena 2007. .
 Keskiajan julmuus (Cruelty in the Middle Ages). Atena 2008. .
 Keskaja köök. Varrak 2008. .
 Mansimarjasta punapuolaan. Marjakasvien kulttuurihistoriaa (Cultural History of Berries). Maahenki 2011. .
 The Medieval Kitchen. A Social History with Recipes. London: Reaktion Books 2012. .
 Federigon haukka ja muita keskiajan eläimiä. (Federigo's Falcon and Other Medieval Animals). Atena 2013. .
 Das Mittelalter-Kochbuch. Köln: Anaconda 2013. .
 Animals and Hunters in the Late Middle Ages. Evidence from the BnF MS fr. 616 of the Livre de chasse by Gaston Fébus. New York: Routledge 2015. .
 中世纪厨房. Shanghai: Shanghai Academy of Social Sciences, 2021. .

References

External links
  Hannele Klemettilä's official website
 David Bremmer's interview on the Epitomes of Evil 
 Daniel Thiery's review on the Epitomes of Evil
 Sinikka Koskinen's review on the Keskiajan julmuus (Medieval cruelty) by Hannele Klemettilä
 Excerpt of Cruelty in the Middle Ages in English

21st-century Finnish historians
Living people
1966 births
Finnish expatriates in England
Finnish expatriates in the United States
Academic staff of the University of Turku